Cylindilla makiharai is a species of beetle in the family Cerambycidae. It was described by Hasegawa in 1992.

References

Desmiphorini
Beetles described in 1992